Long Lye Meadow is a 3.3 hectare biological Site of Special Scientific Interest at Buckland St Mary in the Blackdown Hills, Somerset, notified in 2002.

This site along with the adjoining Long Lye were considered to be under threat from a scheme to widen the A303.

The neutral grassland component varies in character and herb richness. There is a strong population of green-winged orchid (Orchis morio), together with a few plants of common twayblade (Neottia ovata). In a few areas meadow thistle (Cirsium dissectum) occurs.

References 

Sites of Special Scientific Interest in Somerset
Sites of Special Scientific Interest notified in 2002
Meadows in Somerset